Neolysandra is a Palearctic genus of butterflies in the family Lycaenidae.

Species
Listed alphabetically:

 Neolysandra coelestina (Eversmann, 1843)
 Neolysandra corona (Verity, 1936) Lebanon
 Neolysandra diana (Miller, [1913]) Kurdistan 
 Neolysandra ellisoni (Pfeiffer, 1931) Syria and Alborz mountains
 Neolysandra fatima Eckweiler & Schurian, 1980 Kurdistan
 Neolysandra fereiduna Skala, 2002 Iran

References

Polyommatini